The City of Manchester forms part of the metropolitan county of Greater Manchester, which had its county council abolished (along with the other metropolitan counties) in 1986. Manchester consists of several districts, but these districts do not represent a tier of government (though the names are used as political wards).

Political history

Manchester has long been associated with radical politics, including the Peterloo Massacre in 1819; the formation of the Anti-Corn Law League in 1839, as well as being the birthplace to some of the most influential works of Karl Marx and Friedrich Engels.

Manchester currently sits on the left of the political spectrum, as shown by the make up of its City Council. The north of the city is considered a Labour stronghold , while the southern suburbs tend to be more hospitable to other parties. The last Conservative MP lost his seat in 1987.

Manchester City Council

Manchester City Council is the local authority for the metropolitan borough of Manchester. The borough is divided into 32 wards, which elect a total of 96 councillors, three for each ward. Currently, the council is controlled by the Labour Party and is led by Richard Leese. The opposition is formed by the Liberal Democrats and led by former Manchester MP John Leech.

Districts in the City of Manchester

Parishes
There is only one civil parish in the metropolitan borough, Ringway, which was added in 1974.  The entire area of the pre-1974 county borough is an unparished area.

North West Regional Assembly
Whilst not a directly elected body, the North West Regional Assembly is responsible for promoting the economic, environmental and social well-being of the North West England region. It is made up of representatives from councils across the region, business organisations, public sector agencies, education and training bodies, trade unions and co-operatives and the voluntary and community sector.

UK Parliament

There are five UK Parliamentary constituencies which cover the City of Manchester, each of which elects one Member of Parliament (MP) to the House of Commons in London. These constituencies and their current MPs are:

 Manchester Central - Lucy Powell MP (Labour)
 Blackley and Broughton (also covers part of Salford) - Graham Stringer MP (Labour)
 Manchester Gorton - Afzal Khan MP (Labour)
 Manchester Withington - Jeff Smith MP (Labour)
 Wythenshawe and Sale East (also covers part of Trafford) - Mike Kane MP (Labour)

European Parliament

North West England, as a single EU constituency, elected 8 representatives to the European Parliament. At the time of Britain's withdrawal from the European Union the Members of the European Parliament (MEPs) for the North West were:

Greater Manchester

Greater Manchester is a metropolitan county which surrounds the City of Manchester. Including the City of Manchester, Greater Manchester is made up of ten metropolitan boroughs, with each borough having its own council. The ten boroughs are shown in the following map.

The larger towns in the Greater Manchester county include Altrincham, Ashton-under-Lyne, Bolton, Bury, Cheadle, Droylsden, Hyde, Middleton, Oldham, Rochdale, Sale, Stalybridge, Stockport, Stretford and Wigan.

Whilst the county does not have its own tier of government, there are some functions of government organised at the county level.

County-wide functions
Greater Manchester County Council was the top-tier local government body from 1974 to its abolition in 1986. The county still arranges some amenities and services on a county-wide basis. This is largely overseen by Association of Greater Manchester Authorities which represents the ten local authorities of the county, and acts as a body by which co-ordination and county-wide strategies can operate. Greater Manchester Police and Greater Manchester Fire and Rescue Service offer law enforcement and fire protection, while public transport is the responsibility of Transport for Greater Manchester (TfGM). There is also the Greater Manchester Waste Disposal Authority.

AGMA also funds the Greater Manchester County Records Office, whose main function is to collect, store, and make available for research the written heritage of the County, including census and General register office index material.

Law enforcement
The City of Manchester is policed by the Greater Manchester Police, who have their headquarters at Chester House in Trafford. The main police station in central Manchester is at Bootle Street, near to Albert Square. There are other stations in Salford, Hulme, Collyhurst, Withington, Chorlton-cum-Hardy, and Longsight. Manchester's railways are policed by the nationwide British Transport Police.

Manchester had its own police force until 1974, when its force and the lower divisions of Lancashire Constabulary merged to form the Greater Manchester Police. Each of the ten metropolitan boroughs of Greater Manchester has a Division within the county force.

References

Local government in Manchester